Scott McLean (born 30 August 1997) is a Scottish footballer who plays for WoSFL Premier Division club Glenafton Athletic.

Career
McLean began his career at Kilmarnock, making his debut on 12 August 2015, in a 2–2 draw with Celtic.

After spending time in the Juniors with Troon, McLean signed for Albion Rovers in April 2018.

On 16 August 2018, McLean signed for Queen's Park.

McLean signed for Annan Athletic on 16 June 2019.

West of Scotland side Darvel announced the signing of McLean on 9 August 2020, however, McLean signed with Spennymoor Town a month later. In January 2022, McLean joined fellow National League North side Guiseley on loan for the remainder of the 2021–22 season.

In July 2022, McLean returned to Scotland, signing with Scottish League Two side Stranraer, managed by former Kilmarnock team-mate Jamie Hamill. McLean would mark his debut for Stranraer with a goal in a 5–2 loss to former club Queen's Park in the group stage of the Scottish League Cup.

In January 2023, McLean joined WoSFL Premier Division club Glenafton Athletic.

Career statistics

References

External links

1997 births
Living people
Scottish footballers
Kilmarnock F.C. players
Troon F.C. players
Albion Rovers F.C. players
Queen's Park F.C. players
Annan Athletic F.C. players
Scottish Professional Football League players
Scottish Junior Football Association players
Association football forwards
Darvel F.C. players
Spennymoor Town F.C. players
Guiseley A.F.C. players
Stranraer F.C. players

West of Scotland Football League players
Glenafton Athletic F.C. players